Pakistan competed at the 1958 British Empire and Commonwealth Games in Cardiff, in Wales, the United Kingdom.  The 1958 Games were Pakistan's second appearance, having participated in 1954.  It was Pakistan's third-most successful appearance ever, winning three gold medals.  It marked the first of four successive Games at which Pakistan finished in the top ten countries in the medal table (a feat that the country has not accomplished at any other Games outside that sequence).  As in the next two Games, the success was primarily based upon wrestling, in which Pakistan won all three of its golds, as well as three silver medals.

Medals

Gold
 Wrestling - Bantamweight: Muhammad Akhtar
 Wrestling - Lightweight: Muhammad Ashraf
 Wrestling - Weltwerweight: Muhammad Bashir

Silver
 Hammer: Muhammad Iqbal
 Javelin: Jalal Khan (athlete)
 Wrestling - Flyweight: Shujah-ud-Din
 Wrestling - Featherweight: Siraj-ud-Din
 Wrestling - Light Heavyweight: Muhammad Ali (wrestler)

Bronze
 120 yards hurdles: Ghulam Raziq
 Long jump: Muhammad Ramzan Ali

https://en.m.wikipedia.org/wiki/Muhammad_Ramzan_Ali

1958
Nations at the 1958 British Empire and Commonwealth Games
1958 in Pakistani sport